Marcel Ilpide (16 March 1904 – 11 August 1961) was a French racing cyclist. He finished in last place in the 1930 Tour de France.

References

External links
 

1904 births
1961 deaths
French male cyclists
Sportspeople from Lozère
Cyclists from Occitania (administrative region)